ICA Cristo Rey Academy, is a private, all-girls Roman Catholic high school in San Francisco, California, United States that was established in 1883. It is located in the Roman Catholic Archdiocese of San Francisco.

Background
ICA Cristo Rey was established in 1883 by the Dominican Sisters of the Congregation of the Queen of the Holy Rosary of Mission San Jose. The school is located in the heart of San Francisco. ICA Cristo Rey became the first all-girls school in the Cristo Rey Network on August 31, 2009. Since then tuition cost for parents has dropped to about one-third of what it was, with employers paying about $30,000 a year to the school for one entry-level job. The work is performed by four students at each job site, one student from each of the four years. Each year has a day off to work one day a week and an additional day once a month. Since Immaculate Conception is now a Cristo Rey School, it accepts only students who meet the low-family-income criteria. In 2017-2018 the school had 30 sponsors and about 100 work-study partners.

Campus ministry offers service opportunities for the students and each year time off from school for a retreat experience.

Athletics supported by the school include volleyball, basketball, cross-country, soccer, golf, swimming, track & field, and flag football. The school is a member of the San Francisco section of the California Interscholastic Federation and its league Academic Athletic Association.

References

External links
 
 Cristo Rey Network

High schools in San Francisco
Catholic secondary schools in California
Girls' schools in California
Cristo Rey Network
Dominican schools in the United States
Poverty-related organizations
Educational institutions established in 1883
1883 establishments in California